Raging Waters Sydney, formerly Wet'n'Wild Sydney, is a water park in the greater western Sydney suburb of Prospect, New South Wales, Australia, that opened on 12 December 2013. The park was announced on 11 September 2010 and was the third Wet'n'Wild water park operated by Village Roadshow Theme Parks, after locations on the Gold Coast and Las Vegas. On 2 July 2018, it was announced that the park had been acquired by Parques Reunidos who renamed the park Raging Waters Sydney for the 2019 season. It is the only attraction outside the United States owned by Palace Entertainment.

History

On 11 September 2010, New South Wales Premier, Kristina Keneally, joined Village Roadshow Theme Parks' Chief Executive Officer, Tim Fisher, to announce Wet'n'Wild Sydney. The proposal detailed a  water park in Prospect, New South Wales that was set to be one of the top ten water parks in the world.

In a master plan created by Canadian water slide manufacturer, WhiteWater West, Wet'n'Wild Sydney was set to play host to a variety of attractions including two wave pools, two lazy rivers, a children's AquaPlay area, spas and volleyball courts. These ground-level attractions would be coupled by several slide towers featuring a variety of water slides including two AquaLoops, a Boomerango, dueling Master Blasters, a Super Bowl, an Abyss, a six-lane Whizzard, two family raft rides, and a collection of inline tube slides. The whole park was set to cost A$80 million, have a seasonal attendance of over one million visitors, and have a turnover of A$500 million in the first decade of operation.

The commencement of construction was announced by New South Wales Premier, Barry O'Farrell, and Wet'n'Wild Sydney General Manager, Chris Warhurst, on 9 September 2012. The announcement detailed Village Roadshow would now be investing $115 million into the park ahead of its planned opening in late 2013. Plans for the $115 million park were designed by Water Technology Inc. On 12 December 2013, the park officially opened to the public, after several days of soft openings.

The water park was forced to cancel its 2013 New Year's Eve Festival with just six hours' notice due to "a major technical production issue". The event, which was expected to sell-out, was promoted as Australia's "first ever music festival to be held at a water theme park". Village Roadshow later stated that the organiser's "management plan for crowd control and safety failed to meet Wet'n'Wild's standards". The event was later moved to Australia Day.

Attendance
Raging Waters Sydney reached the milestone of 10 million guests in 307 days since its grand opening, which is a record among theme parks worldwide. The previous record-holder was Wet 'n Wild Orlando, 338 days after its opening.
Raging Waters Sydney debuted with the release of its immediate predecessor, Disney California Adventure.

Attractions

Raging Waters Sydney features several water slide attractions; a large wave pool; a children's area; food, beverage and retail outlets; and a Surf Life Saving Club. The park features four water slide towers, each featuring a collection of slides grouped by the level of thrill. The park is centred around a large wave pool known as The Beach.

To the left of the park entrance tower two, containing three slides by ProSlide Technology: Bombora, Tantrum and T5. All of the slides use four-person cloverleaf-shaped rafts. Bombora is a Tornado Wave slide where riders are taken on an enclosed flume ride before dropping down to the ground and riding up a large wave-shaped surface. Here, riders experience a feeling of weightlessness. The second slide is the T5, a ProSlide Tornado 60. The ride is characterised by a large funnel,  in diameter, in which riders oscillate back and forth. Both before and after the main funnel element riders navigate through enclosed flume segments. The final slide on this tower is Tantrum, a ProSlide Tornado 24. Several enclosed flume segments link the three funnels, leading the ride to the shared splashdown pool.

Tower one is located adjacent to the first, and contains two slides manufactured by WhiteWater West: H2Go Racer and 360Rush. H2Go Racer is an eight-lane Whizzard Twist where riders race head-first on a mat down the slide to the runout chutes. Riders begin by entering an enclosed tube section where the individual lanes are braided. The lanes then enter a 360-degree helix, before emerging for a final open drop. The second ride is the 360Rush, a pair of AquaLoop looping water slides, featuring a trap door release with 3G acceleration and a top speed of                                                   

.  A new slide, Whirlwind, opened for the 2019-20 season, replacing a second pair of 360 Rush slides. 

On the other side of The Beach is tower four, featuring five slides also by WhiteWater West: Half Pipe, Typhoon, Tropical Cyclone, The Breakers, and AquaTube. All slides but one on this tower use two-person inline tubes, the exception being typhoon, which uses a four person raft. Half Pipe is a Boomerango of a similar design to Bombora; however, the exit chute from the vertical wall features a small camel hump for a second moment of weightlessness. Typhoon is a Rattler where riders slide down open flume sections before entering two cylinders at right angles. Riders oscillate back and forth inside the cylinders before emerging and continuing with the open slide. Tropical Cyclone is a Constrictor, a slide characterised by three wide helices. Internally, these helices measure  in diameter as opposed to the  helices evidenced in the rest of the slide. The Breakers are a set of four Master Blaster slides. These slides mimic roller coasters by providing not only descents, but ascents as well. Ascents are achieved through water jets blasting the raft uphill. AquaTube is a traditional flume ride that features enclosed twists and turns in complete darkness. The ride is a Giant AquaTube by WhiteWater West.

The final tower, tower three, was manufactured by ProSlide Technology and features three slides: Double Bowlseye, The Curler and Riptide. The tower is located near the front of the park. They used round rafts that can seat between four and five people but they kept getting stuck in the rides so they have been replaced by Cloverleaf rafts that seat only 4 people. Double Bowlseye is a Behemoth Bowl 40 where riders descend a dark tunnel before entering two large, open bowls. The raft circles the centre of the bowls before exiting down through the centre and into another flume channel. The Curler and Riptide are two Mammoth slides. The Curler is characterised by enclosed twists and turns while Riptide features a large open-air double drop to conclude the ride.

Three family-oriented attractions and one upcharge attractions are located on the ground level, detached from the main slide towers. In addition to aforementioned wave pool, The Beach, other attractions include Dinosaur Lagoon, (formerly Boomerang Bay) a lazy and action river, and Raging Waters JNR (Formerly Nickelodeon Beach and originally Wet'n'Wild Junior), a children's area featuring miniature versions of the park's main attractions. The first upcharge attraction is the Sydney SkyCoaster, the world's largest double Skycoaster. The ride was manufactured by Skycoaster, Inc., a wholly owned division of Ride Entertainment Group, who installed the ride.

MyBand
Raging Waters Sydney includes a wireless ticketing and payment system fully integrated into the park's infrastructure. The technology is called MyBand and uses radio-frequency identification held inside a silicon wristband which patrons wear. Season Pass holders are issued a permanent MyBand, while Single Day Admission ticketed guests receive a temporary MyBand. The device is used by uploading cash from the park or online which can then be used to purchase retail items, food and beverages with a simple swipe. The system was designed by RFID n Print.

Complaints
Shortly after opening, various complaints had been made about ticket and food pricing, long queues, venue capacity, long lines for the car park, and rides being shut down without apparent reason.

Customers have also reported injuries on the rides, including an 8-year old girl.

Season history
Season 1:  – 

Season 2:  – 

Season 3:  – 

Season 4:  – 

Season 5:  – 

Season 6:  – 

Season 7:  – 

Season 8:  – 

Season 9:  – 

Season 10:  –

See also
 Wet'n'Wild Gold Coast

References

External links
 
 

Water parks in New South Wales
Tourist attractions in Sydney
2013 establishments in Australia
Prospect, New South Wales
Parques Reunidos